Maria Aurélia Martins de Sousa (June 13, 1866 – May 26, 1922) was a Portuguese painter.

Biography
She was born in Valparaíso, Chile, the fourth of seven children to Portuguese emigrants António Martins de Sousa and Olinda Peres.  The family lived in Brazil and Chile before moving back to Porto, Portugal in 1869, when she was three years old. They lived in the Quinta de China near the Douro River in a home bought by her father before he died in 1874, when she was eight years old. She was sister of the painter Sofia Martins de Sousa.

At the age of sixteen she began taking lessons with António da Costa Lima and painted her first self-portrait.  In 1893 she began studies at the Fine-Arts Academy of Porto, where she was a pupil of João Marques de Oliveira, who greatly influenced her style. In 1898, she moved to Paris to study painting at the Julian Academy, taking courses with  Jean-Paul Laurens and Jean-Joseph Benjamin-Constant. She held her first exhibition, then traveled in Europe in the next three years, before finally returning to Portugal in 1901, where she worked as an illustrator and participated regularly in Porto's art scene, exhibiting at the Sociedade de Belas-Artes do Porto, in the Galeria da Misericórdia, and annually in the Sociedade Nacional de Belas-Artes, in Lisbon.

She died in Porto in 1922, at fifty-five years old.

Her painting was of a personal and naturalist style, at times with realism, impressionism and post-impressionism influences. Her subjects included portraits, landscapes, and scenes of everyday life. She is most famous for her "Self-Portrait", painted in 1900.

Tribute
On June 13, 2021, Google celebrated her 155th birthday with a Google Doodle.

References

Bibliography

 SILVA; Raquel Henriques da, Aurélia de Souza, Col. Pintores Portugueses. Lisboa: Edições Inapa, 2004.

External links
 Aurélia de Sousa, Antiga Estudante da Academia de Belas Artes do Porto

1867 births
1922 deaths
People from Valparaíso
University of Porto alumni
Académie Julian alumni
19th-century Portuguese painters
20th-century Portuguese painters
19th-century women artists
20th-century Portuguese women artists
Chilean people of Portuguese descent